The Mapuche football team is a football team representing the Mapuche of Chile and Argentina and is controlled by the Mapuche Football Association, founded in 2007. The stated mission of the team is "...to allow Mapuche as a distinct cultural entity,  with common interests to be represented at the international level in the sport. Mapuche is a member of ConIFA and COSANFF. Mapuche will participate in the 2020 ConIFA World Football Cup.

Mapuche won the 2015 Championship national football of native peoples.

The selection of Mapuche appears in a fake documentary, in the 1942 FIFA World Cup in Patagonia and wins the competition in the final against Germany (2–1).

Tournament records

ConIFA World Football Cup record

ConIFA South America Football Cup record

Championship national football of native peoples

Temuco Anniversary Cup
131st anniversary of the founding of the city of Temuco in Chile.

Results and upcoming fixtures

It seems that there were 2 games during the Copa de Fútbol de Universitarios Mapuche 2012.

Selected International Opponents

Results by year

References

Mapuche
Football teams in Chile
Football teams in Argentina
CONIFA member associations